Oregon Route 244 (OR 244) is an Oregon state highway running from Ukiah in Umatilla County to Hilgard in Union County. OR 244 is known as the Ukiah-Hilgard Highway No. 341 (see Oregon highways and routes).

Route description

History
This is the 2nd Oregon Route to use the number 244.  The first OR 244 was located in suburban Portland, connecting U.S. 99W near Tualatin with OR 43 in West Linn.  That route later became part of an extended Oregon Route 212, but was deleted from the state highway system after Interstate 205 was completed.

Major intersections

References

244
Transportation in Umatilla County, Oregon
Transportation in Union County, Oregon